Pelargoderus dibbhincksi is a species of beetle in the family Cerambycidae. It was described by Gilmour in 1947.

References

dibbhincksi
Beetles described in 1947